Dairy Queen (DQ) is an American chain of soft serve ice cream and fast food restaurants headquartered in Bloomington, Minnesota, United States. It was owned and operated by Sherb Noble and opened on June 22, 1940. It serves a variety of its own original frozen products that vary from location to location.

History
The soft-serve formula was first developed in 1938 by John Fremont "J.F." "Grandpa" McCullough and his son Alex. They convinced friend and loyal customer Sherb Noble to offer the product in his ice cream store in Kankakee, Illinois. On the first day of sales, Noble sold more than 1,600 servings of the new dessert within two hours. Noble and the McCulloughs went on to open the first Dairy Queen store in 1940 in Joliet, Illinois. It closed in the 1950s, but the building at 501 N Chicago Street is a city-designated landmark.

Since 1940, the chain has used a franchise system to expand its operations globally. The first ten stores in 1941 grew to 100 by 1947, 1,446 in 1950, and 2,600 in 1955. The first store in Canada opened in Melville, Saskatchewan, in 1953. In the US, the state with the most Dairy Queen restaurants is Texas. Using the 2010 census, the state with the most Dairy Queen restaurants per person is Minnesota.

In the 1990s, investors bought Dairy Queen stores that were individually owned, intending to increase profitability through economies of scale. Vasari, LLC became the second-largest Dairy Queen operator in the country and operated 70 Dairy Queens across Texas, Oklahoma and New Mexico. When stores were not profitable, the firm closed them. On October 30, 2017, Vasari LLC filed for bankruptcy and announced it was closing 29 DQ stores, including ten in the Texas Panhandle.

International Dairy Queen, Inc. (IDQ) is the parent company of Dairy Queen. In the United States, it operates as American Dairy Queen Corporation (commonly known as Am. DQ Corp.).

At the end of fiscal year 2014, Dairy Queen reported over 6,400 stores in more than 25 countries; about 4,500 of them (approximately 70%) were in the United States.

The red Dairy Queen symbol was introduced in 1958.

The company became International Dairy Queen, Inc. (IDQ) in 1962. IDQ is the parent company of American Dairy Queen Corporation (which owns the DQ intellectual property, and is often abbreviated "Am. D.Q. Corp." in the chain's legal disclaimers), Dairy Queen Canada Inc., and other entities that franchise the Dairy Queen concept.

In 1987, IDQ bought the Orange Julius chain. IDQ was acquired by Berkshire Hathaway in 1998.

Dairy Queens were a fixture of social life in small towns of the Midwestern and Southern United States during the 1950s and 1960s. They have often been reflected in stories and memoirs of small-town America, as in Walter Benjamin at the Dairy Queen: Reflections at Sixty and Beyond by Larry McMurtry, Dairy Queen Days by Robert Inman,Chevrolet Summers, Dairy Queen Nights by Bob Greene, and "The Outsiders" by S. E. Hinton including the film adaptation by Francis Ford Coppola.

Stores 
The company's stores are operated under several brands, all bearing the Dairy Queen logo and carrying the company's signature soft-serve ice cream. "Brazier" locations, with expanded food menus and second floors for storage, are recognizable by their red mansard roofs.

By the end of 2014, Dairy Queen had more than 6,400 stores in 27 countries, including more than 1,400 outside the United States and Canada.

The largest Dairy Queen in the US is in Bloomington, Illinois. The largest in the world is in Riyadh, Saudi Arabia, and the busiest in the world is in Charlottetown, Prince Edward Island.

Standard stores 

While some stores serve a very abbreviated menu primarily featuring DQ frozen treats and may be open only during spring, summer, and fall, the majority of DQ restaurants also serve hot food and are open all year.

So-called "Limited Brazier" locations may additionally offer hot dogs, barbecue beef (or pork) sandwiches, and in some cases french fries and chicken, but not hamburgers. Dairy Queen Full Brazier restaurants serve a normal fast-food menu featuring burgers, french fries, and grilled and crispy chicken in addition to frozen treats and hot dogs.

In some locations built in the 1990s, the "Hot Eats, Cool Treats" slogan can be seen printed on windows or near the roof of the building. One such example was a former Dairy Queen Brazier location in Woodinville, Washington, where the slogan was printed near the tops of the windows. This location was converted into a Grill & Chill store around late 2016–2017.

Franchise background 
The liquid capital required to invest in a Dairy Queen franchise is $400,000, and the minimum net worth is $750,000. The initial franchise fee is $45,000, while the total investment amount required ranges from $1.1 million to $1.8 million. There are 5,700 operating Dairy Queen units. In addition to the upfront investment costs, the royalty fee for Dairy Queen franchisees is 4%, and the advertisement royalty fee is 5-6%. The franchise term of agreement lasts for 20 years, and the contract is renewable.

Dairy Queen does not offer in-house financing options, they only offer third party financing. This third party financing covers the franchise fee, startup costs, equipment, inventory, accounts receivable, and payroll.

DQ / Orange Julius 
Also known as the "Treat Center" concept, an enhanced version of the original stores also serves drinks and foods from the Orange Julius menu. This was the company's preferred concept for new, small-scale locations, primarily in shopping malls food courts. Some early Treat Centers also included Karmelkorn.

Dairy Queen Brazier 

The name "Brazier" originated in 1957 when one of the company's franchisees, Jim Cruikshank, set out to develop the standardized food system. When he witnessed flames rising from an open charcoal grill (a brazier) in a New York eatery, he knew he had found the Brazier concept.

The "Brazier" name has been slowly phased out of signage and advertising since 1993, although it has not been removed from all existing signage, especially in smaller towns and rural locations. Since the early 2000s, new or renovated locations which are similar to Brazier restaurants in terms of size and menu selection, but have been updated with the current logo or exterior, usually carry the name "DQ Restaurant", although the website's store locator still lists the stores that do not carry the "Grill & Chill" name as "Dairy Queen Brazier" and the smaller stores "Dairy Queen Ltd Brazier" and "Dairy Queen Store".

The company website still considers its burger and hot dog lines as "Brazier Foods", according to the history section and some FAQ listed topics on the website.

DQ Grill & Chill 

DQ Grill & Chill locations feature hot food, treats, table delivery, and self-serve soft drinks. It is the new concept for new and renovated full-service restaurants. Stores are larger than older-style locations and feature a completely new store design. In most cases, they offer an expanded menu including breakfast, GrillBurgers, and grilled sandwiches, as well as limited table service (customers still place orders at the counter). They also contain self-serve soft drink fountains allowing free refills. Some of the older stores have upgraded to the new format. However, there are still older stores that have not upgraded to the new format. In December 2001, Chattanooga, Tennessee, was the site of the first two Dairy Queen Grill and Chill restaurants in the United States. The nation's largest DQ Grill & Chill is located in Bloomington, Illinois.

Texas Country Foods 

All locations in Texas, including those which otherwise resemble the Brazier or DQ Grill & Chill formats, use a separate hot food menu branded as Texas Country Foods. Among other differences, "Hungr-Buster" burgers are available in place of the Brazier and GrillBurger offerings. Other food offerings not found outside Texas include the "Dude" chicken-fried steak sandwich, steak finger country baskets, T-Brand tacos, and a one-half pound double meat hamburger, the "BeltBuster".

Texas is home to the largest number of Dairy Queens in the U.S. All Texas Dairy Queen restaurants are owned and operated by franchisees. The Texas Dairy Queen Operators' Council (TDQOC) runs a separate marketing website from the national website. Bob Phillips, host of the popular Texas syndicated television series Texas Country Reporter, was for many years the DQ spokesman in Texas, as the restaurant was a co-sponsor of the program at the time.

Products 
The company's products expanded to include malts and milkshakes in 1950, banana splits in 1951, Dilly Bars in 1955 (introduced to the franchise by Robert Litherland, the co-owner of a store in Moorhead, Minnesota), Mr. Misty slush treats in 1961 (later renamed Misty Slush, then again to Arctic Rush; as of 2017, DQ again calls them Misty Slush, as seen on dairyqueen.com), Jets, Curly Tops, Freezes in 1964, and a range of hamburgers and other cooked foods under the Brazier banner in 1958.  In 1962, the Buster Bar, consisting of vanilla soft serve in the shape of a small cup with a layer of and covered with peanuts and chocolate was invented by David Skjerven 1962 in Grafton, North Dakota. In 1971, the Peanut Buster Parfait, consisting of peanuts, hot fudge, and vanilla soft serve, was introduced by Forrest 'Frosty' Chapman in his St. Peter, Minnesota Franchise. In 1990, the Breeze was launched, like a Blizzard but was made with non-fat, cholesterol-free yogurt. This was pulled from stores in 2000. In 1995, the Chicken Strip Basket was introduced, consisting of chicken strips, Texas toast (only in the US), fries, and cream gravy (gravy in Canada). Other items include sundaes and the blended coffee drink, the MooLatte. Another sundae made by Dairy Queen is the peanut buster parfait thoroughly enjoyed and invented by Patsy Franks in 1969.

In Northwest Washington State, Dairy Queen has chicken strip trays which include chicken strips, a sauce, and french fries. Small bread slices coated in butter come with the dish/box. Chocolate shakes come in cups with an open-top, and they are topped with whipped cream.

Blizzard 

A popular Dairy Queen item is the Blizzard, which is soft-serve mechanically blended with mix-in ingredients such as sundae toppings and/or pieces of cookies, brownies, or candy. It has been a staple on the menu since its introduction in 1985, a year in which Dairy Queen sold more than 100 million Blizzards. Popular flavors include Oreo cookies, mint Oreo, chocolate chip cookie dough, M&M's, Reese's Peanut Butter Cups, Heath Bar (Skor in Canada), and Butterfinger (Crispy Crunch in Canada). Seasonal flavors are also available such as October's pumpkin pie and June's cotton candy. It has been argued that Dairy Queen drew its inspiration from the concrete served by the St. Louis-based Ted Drewes. On July 26, 2010, Dairy Queen introduced a new "mini" size Blizzard, served in 6 oz. cups. During the 25th anniversary of the Blizzard, two special flavors were released: Strawberry Golden Oreo Blizzard and Buster Bar Blizzard. Salted Caramel Truffle was released in 2015 during the Blizzard's 30th anniversary and Dairy Queen's 75th anniversary, but it has since been removed from the menu.

Blizzards derive their name from being so thoroughly cold and thick that the cup can be held upside down after serving without any of the contents falling out. Employees will frequently demonstrate this to customers. There is a company policy that one Blizzard per order is to be flipped upside-down by the employee. If this does not occur, the customer may request a coupon for a free Blizzard to use on their next visit, though this is at the franchise owner's discretion.

Prior to the reintroduction of the Blizzard in 1985, Dairy Queen served conventional "thick" milkshakes called "Blizzards" in the 1960s. This time period also introduced the currently-held tradition of the shake being flipped upside down when served to the customer. The original "Blizzards" sold for the premium price of 50 cents in 1962. These were served in traditional flavors such as vanilla, chocolate, and strawberry, with or without added malt on request. The Blizzard was also invented by Samuel Temperato.

In addition, Dairy Queen offers a Blizzard Cake in flavors such as Oreo and Reese's. Much like the restaurant's conventional ice cream cake, this variation is aimed toward celebrations and birthdays.

Frozen yogurt 
In 1990, Dairy Queen began offering frozen yogurt as a lower-calorie alternative to its soft serve ice cream. The product was named Breeze. According to a company representative, Dairy Queen's regular soft serve has 35 calories per ounce, whereas the frozen yogurt was 25 calories per ounce. However, in 2001, the company phased out the frozen yogurt option in all its stores, citing a lack of demand.

In 2011, International Dairy Queen Inc. filed a request for a preliminary injunction to stop Yogubliz Inc, a small California-based frozen yogurt chain, from selling "Blizzberry" and "Blizz Frozen Yogurt", alleging that the names could confuse consumers due to their similarity to Dairy Queen's Blizzard. U.S. District Judge R. Gary Klausner denied Dairy Queen's request.

Cage-free egg commitment 
In May 2016, Dairy Queen committed to requiring suppliers in the United States and Canada to purchase eggs only from approved cage-free egg suppliers by 2025. In the U.S., 67 percent of shell eggs, liquid eggs, and proprietary DQ ingredients that contain eggs have either converted to cage-free or were reformulated to remove egg as an ingredient since Dairy Queen made their commitment. In Canada, 39 percent of shell eggs, liquid eggs, and proprietary DQ ingredients that contain eggs have either converted to cage-free or were reformulated to remove egg as an ingredient since Dairy Queen made their commitment.

Dairy Queen's commitment includes shell and liquid eggs at restaurants that serve breakfast, as well as any eggs used as ingredients for proprietary food and treat products. The company has also committed to requiring any new egg suppliers in the future to provide cage-free eggs.

Some consider cage-free egg production to be a more humane method of production than conventional methods representing the majority of current production in the United States and Canada. There is no mention of Dairy Queen's cage-free commitment in their restaurants outside of the US and Canada.

Advertising
From 1979 until 1981, the restaurant chain used the slogan "It's a real treat!". For many years, the franchise's slogan was "We treat you right". From the early-to-mid 1990s, the slogans "Hot Eats, Cool Treats" and "Think DQ" were used and preceded the aforementioned line in the Dairy Queen jingle. Later on, it was changed to "Meet Me at DQ" and "DQ: Something Different". Another slogan, introduced in early 2011, was "So Good It's RiDQulous", with Dairy Queen's current logo infused in the word "ridiculous". In the mid-to-late 2010s, their slogan was "Fan Food, Not Fast Food". As of April 2019, Dairy Queen uses the slogan "Happy Tastes Good". The slogan This is Fan Food not Fast Food was still used on the cups, wrappers, and paper baskets for a while.

In Texas, at the end of advertisements, there is frequently a Texas flag waving, and the new DQ logo and slogan below saying, "Eat Like A Texan". Previous slogans include "That's what I like about Texas", "For Hot Eats & Cool Treats, Think DQ", "Nobody beats DQ Treats & Eats", "DQ is Value Country", and "This is DQ Country". These advertisements featured Texas Country Reporter host Bob Phillips as a spokesperson since his program was mainly sponsored by Dairy Queen.

Dennis the Menace appeared in Dairy Queen marketing from 1971 until December 2002, when he was dropped because Dairy Queen felt children could no longer relate to him. From 2006 to July 2011, the advertising focused on a large mouth with its tongue licking its large lips, which morphs into the Dairy Queen logo. The mouth was dropped in 2011 after Grey New York produced outlandish spots featuring a dapper man, played by John Behlmann, sporting a mustache, performing crazy feats for Dairy Queen replacing it. After announcing tasty menu offers, he would do something outrageous, like blow bubbles with kittens in them, water ski while boxing, or break a piñata, out of which tumbles Olympic gymnastics great Mary Lou Retton. Later, the same firm made additional commercials based around odd situation titles with the DQ logo placed somewhere in them, like "Gary DQlones Himself", "Now That's A Lunchtime DQuandary!", "After The DQonquest" and "Well, This Is A Bit DQrazy!". All were narrated by a man with an English accent.

In 2015, Dairy Queen and model railroad company of Milwaukee, Wm. K. Walthers came out with a Walthers Cornerstone HO 1:87 Scale models of a restaurant – one from the 1950s with the original logo and one from 2007 with the current logo. The models are both officially licensed replicas.

Logos

The original Dairy Queen logo was simply a stylized text sign with a soft-serve cone at one end. In the late 1950s, the widely recognized red ellipse design was adopted. The initial shape was asymmetrical, with one of the side points having a greater extension than the other, especially when matched with the Brazier sign—a similarly sized yellow ovoid, tucked diagonally below its companion. By the 1970s, both sides were more closely matched, becoming symmetrical with the 2007 update (see online images for comparison). Some of the new 1950s signs continued to display a soft-serve cone jutting from the right side.

"Little Miss Dairy Queen" began appearing in Pennsylvania signage in 1961. She had a Dutch bonnet, resembling the ellipse logo, with a pinafore apron over her dress and wooden shoes.

A yellow trapezoid Brazier sign, placed below the red Dairy Queen logo, was developed in the late 1960s. It matched the roofline of the new store design of the era.

The 1990s saw a new style of design, boxier with red strips containing the "Hot Eats, Cool Treats" slogan of the era near the roofline (some stores have removed this); straddling the center of the facade was a large blue sign that was a modernized take on the soft-serve cone design of the early 1950s, with white and red pinstripes trailing out from beneath the full Dairy Queen name, underneath the cone; the cone itself was now facing the building, to accommodate the physical ellipse logo; the sign continued further down the wall, with an angle and a "Brazier" logo strip. Additional cone signs were used to mark the entrance and exit of the store for drivers. This design was largely used on new stores but was sometimes used for remodeling older locations.

Although it had been used interchangeably with the Dairy Queen name for many decades, "DQ" became the company's official name in 2001. The font remained the same as in the original signage introduced 60 years prior. Throughout this period, the company placed the registered mark symbol immediately to the right, on the bottom side of the logo. When the company modernized its signage and logos in early 2007, it modified the font and italicized the letters, as well as adding arced lines, an orange one to represent its hot foods above and a blue one below to represent its ice cream products. In the new design, the registered mark symbol was moved to be adjacent to the letter "Q". The first overhaul of its logo in almost 70 years, the company claimed that the new logo would show brand growth and reflect the "fun and enjoyment" associated with its products. Advertising industry observers have noted that the new logo was an unneeded update of a known and trusted industry brand and that its new features were distracting.

The original signage is still in use in older locations or in locations that use a "retro" design motif in the property's design. One example was the sign used at the Dairy Queen in Ottawa, Ontario, which was destroyed and replaced in 2013.

Global operations 

Countries currently with Dairy Queen operations:

 Bahamas
 Bahrain
 Brunei
 Cambodia
 Canada
 China
 Guyana
 Indonesia
 Jamaica
 Kuwait
 Laos
 Mexico
 Panama
 Philippines
 Qatar
 Thailand
 Trinidad and Tobago
 United Arab Emirates
 United States
 Vietnam

Countries and regions formerly with Dairy Queen operations:

 Australia 
 Austria (withdrew around 1999)
 Cayman Islands
 Costa Rica
 Cyprus
 Dominican Republic (withdrew in the 2000s)
 Egypt
 Gabon
 Guam
 Guatemala
 Hungary (withdrew in the 1990s)
 Italy
 Japan
 Macau
 Malaysia
 Morocco (withdrew in the 2000s)
 Oman
 Poland (withdrew in 2016)
 Puerto Rico (withdrew in the 2000s)
 Saudi Arabia
 Singapore (withdrew in 2016)
 South Korea
 Slovenia (withdrew in 2000)
 Taiwan
 Turkey (withdrew in the 2010s)

See also
 Fosters Freeze
 List of fast food restaurant chains
 List of hamburger restaurants
 List of hot dog restaurants
 Miracle Treat Day (Dairy Queen)
 Sonic Drive-In

References

Further reading

External links

1940 establishments in Illinois
1997 mergers and acquisitions
Berkshire Hathaway
Companies based in Edina, Minnesota
Economy of the Midwestern United States
Fast-food chains of Canada
Fast-food chains of the United States
Fast-food franchises
Fast-food hamburger restaurants
Ice cream parlors
Restaurant chains in the United States
Restaurants established in 1940